Kenneth Lee McMullen (born June 1, 1942) is an American former Major League Baseball third baseman.

Los Angeles Dodgers
McMullen signed with the Los Angeles Dodgers upon graduation from Oxnard High School. He collected three hits in eleven at-bats.

He was awarded the starting third base job out of Spring training , but after committing five errors while batting just .205 with one home run and three RBIs through April, he was optioned to triple A Spokane. After Manager Walter Alston shifted left fielder Tommy Davis to third, and tried several other players at third base, McMullen was brought back up from Spokane at the end of June. His first major league home run was a grand slam off the St. Louis Cardinals' Ernie Broglio on the Fourth of July. He raised his average to a far more respectable .236 by the end of the season while hitting five home runs with 28 RBIs. He pulled a hamstring on September 26 against the New York Mets anddid not play in the World Series against the New York Yankees.

He started the  season with the Dodgers, but poor fielding and a .209 batting average landed him back with the Spokane Indians by the middle of June. At the end of the season, he was traded with Frank Howard, Phil Ortega and Pete Richert to the Washington Senators for John Kennedy and Claude Osteen.

Washington Senators
McMullen won an everyday job batting second for Gil Hodges' Senators. On August 13, 1965, he tied an AL record by starting four double plays against the Baltimore Orioles. On September 26, he set an AL record with eleven assists from third against the Boston Red Sox (a mark later tied by Mike Ferraro).

McMullen had his first career multi-home run game on July 16, 1967. Later in the same month, he embarked on a career-high 19-game hit streak, which saw him hit a game-winning home run to end a twenty inning marathon with the Minnesota Twins on August 9. He batted a career-high .272 while driving in a career-high 87 runs in 1969. In all, he clubbed 86 home runs and drove in 327 during five plus seasons with the Senators. Shortly into the  season, he was dealt to the California Angels for Rick Reichardt and Aurelio Rodríguez.

California Angels
On July 17, 1971, McMullen scored from third on a sacrifice bunt by Bruce Christensen, giving his rookie teammate his first major league RBI. He had a 17-game hit streak from July 23 to August 16, . On November 28, 1972, McMullen was part of a blockbuster trade, as he and Andy Messersmith were sent to the Los Angeles Dodgers for Billy Grabarkewitz, Frank Robinson, Bill Singer, Mike Strahler and Bobby Valentine.

Pinch hitter
McMullen played the  season opener at third base, but was soon displaced by rookie Ron Cey. From there, he served mostly as a pinch hitter, going six-for-nineteen with a walk, two home runs and nine RBIs in that role. He spent two more seasons backing up Cey and pinch hitting in Los Angeles, clubbing a pinch hit grand slam against the San Diego Padres on April 24, . He was released during Spring training , but soon after caught on with the Oakland Athletics. He spent one season in Oakland, serving primarily as a designated hitter and pinch hitter.

He spent his final season with the Milwaukee Brewers before retiring. He hit a pinch hit home run against the Seattle Mariners in his final career at bat.

Personal life
Prior to his 1973 season with the Dodgers, McMullen’s wife Bobbie (Goldie McMullen) was diagnosed with breast cancer. Three months pregnant at the time with the couple’s third child, she declined treatment that could have prematurely terminated her pregnancy. Her cancer treatment began after she gave birth to son Jonathan in November 1973. McMullen was able to continue with his baseball activities because of the insistence of his wife who died on April 6, . They have three children, Ryan, Tamara, Kenna and Jon.

Career

Robbed of the opportunity to play in the 1963 World Series by an injury, McMullen returned to the post-season in the twilight of his career with the Los Angeles Dodgers. In the 1974 National League Championship Series, he struck out against the Pittsburgh Pirates' Bruce Kison in his only post-season at-bat.

References

External links
, or Baseball Almanac, or Baseball Biography, or Retrosheet

1942 births
Living people
Arizona Instructional League Dodgers players
Baseball players from California
California Angels players
Dodgers Legend Bureau
Los Angeles Dodgers players
Major League Baseball third basemen
Milwaukee Brewers players
Oakland Athletics players
Omaha Dodgers players
Reno Silver Sox players
Spokane Indians players
Sportspeople from Oxnard, California
Washington Senators (1961–1971) players